Francisco Xavier Serbiá Queipo (born July 24, 1968, in San Juan, Puerto Rico) is a financial commentator, syndicated columnist, and news anchor of CNN Dinero at CNN en Español. Serbiá is also a former member of the boy band Menudo.

Serbiá also hosted a Spanish version of the game show Remote Control, named Control Remoto, for three months on Puerto Rican television's WAPA-TV during 1989.  Mr. Serbiá has a master's degree in Economics from Trinity College and an MBA in Finance from Keller Graduate School of Management.

As an actor, Serbia acted in a sitcom named La Pensión de Doña Tere as well as on the teen musical comedy films Menudo: La Pelicula and Una aventura llamada Menudo, the two latter in which he shared credits with his fellow Menudo band members.

Personal
Serbiá's first wife died. He is now married to an Argentine named Fabiana Uballes. He has one son.

In pop culture 
Serbia is played by Samu Jove in the 2020 Amazon Prime Video series based on Menudo, Subete A Mi Moto.

Books

Discography

With Menudo 
 Es Navidad (1980)
 Fuego (1981)
 Xanadu (1981)
 Quiero Ser (1981)
 Por Amor (1982)
 Una aventura llamada Menudo (1982)
 Feliz Navidad (1982)

With Proyecto M 
 Proyecto M (1987)

As a solo artist (as Xavier) 
 Sere (1991)
 Para Siempre (1992)

See also 

 List of Puerto Ricans

References

External links
 Official Twitter account
 

1968 births
Living people
American commentators
Puerto Rican columnists
American television journalists
Menudo (band) members
20th-century Puerto Rican male singers
People from San Juan, Puerto Rico
Puerto Rican journalists
Trinity College (Connecticut) alumni
20th-century American journalists
American male journalists
People from Bayamón, Puerto Rico